Brookula angeli is a species of sea snail, a marine gastropod mollusk, unassigned in the superfamily Seguenzioidea.

Description
The height of the shell is 5 mm.
The small shell is turbinate, depressed, orbicular, and rather solid. It is sordid white and clouded red. It is irregularly keeled all over, with the interstices finely, irregularly, neatly obliquely lirate, and peculiarly punctate. The larger keels are smooth or obsoletely granular. The five whorls are convex, the
last obtusely angular. The base of the shell is flat or slightly convex and spirally lirate with equal lirae and spotted brown. The interstices are transversely neatly
striate. The aperture is subquadrate. The outer lip is closely dentate. The throat is conspicuously lirate. The columella is obtusely unidentate. The margin of the umbilicus is regularly tuberculate with rounded granular tubercles.

Distribution
This species occurs off Tasmania, Australia.

References

 Iredale, T. (1912). New generic names and new species of marine Mollusca. Proceedings of the Malacological Society of London. 10(3): 217-228, pl. 9. [

External links
 To Biodiversity Heritage Library (1 publication)
 

angeli
Gastropods described in 1876